Bovista plumbea, also referred to as the paltry puffball, is a small puffball mushroom commonly found in Western Europe and California, white when young and greyish in age. Easily confused with immature Bovista dermoxantha, it is attached to the substrate by a tuft of mycelium.

Description
The fruiting body of the sporocarp is 1.5–3.5 cm broad, attached to the substrate by a tuft of mycelium, and spherical to slightly compressed. The exoperidium is white, becoming buff to pale-tan and minutely tomentose, and sometimes areolate. It eventually flakes away, or peels off in sheets, the latter occurring at maturation in hot, dry conditions. In contrast, the endoperidium membranes are lead-grey, with or without adhering fragments of exoperidium. They often live in scattered to clustered in disturbed areas, especially in sparse grass. They are edible when young and white, but are often considered too small for eating.

Spores

Spores are 5.0–6.5 x 4.0–5.5 µm, ovoid, thick-walled, and nearly smooth, with a central oil droplet, and a 7.5–11.5 µm pedicel. The capillitium is composed of individual elements, rather than interwoven, main branches thick-walled, flexuous, rapidly tapering, forking more or less dichotomously, ochre-colored in KOH.

The spores are released via a small apical pore. The gleba is white, turning dingy yellowish, olive-brown, finally dark-brown and firm-textured. However, the subgleba and sterile base are usually absent. Fruiting occurs throughout the mushroom season.

Synonyms
Obsolete synonyms for B. plumbea include:
Bovista ovalispora Cooke & Massee 1887
Bovista plumbea Pers. 1796
Bovista plumbea var. ovalispora (Cooke & Massee) F. Šmarda 1958
Calvatia bovista (L.) Pers. 1896
Lycoperdon bovista Sowerby 1803
Lycoperdon plumbeum Vittad. 1842

References

Agaricaceae
Fungi of Europe
Fungi of North America
Puffballs
Fungi described in 1795
Taxa named by Christiaan Hendrik Persoon